East of the Sun is the fifth album from collaborative group Tuatara, and part of a double album release with West of the Moon. It is the first Tuatara album with lyrics, sung by a variety of guest vocalists.

Track listing
"Waterhole" (Peter Buck, Barrett Martin, and Scott McCaughey) – 3:56 (vocals by McCaughey)
"The Spaniard" (Buck, Gary Louris, Martin, and McCaughey) – 4:08 (vocals by Louris)
"Bones, Blood and Skin" (Buck, Jessy Greene, Martin, and McCaughey) – 4:43 (vocals by Greene)
"Silo Spring Violets" (Coleman Barks, Buck, Martin, and McCaughey) – 3:29 (vocals by Barks)
"Trouble Rides In" (Buck, Martin, McCaughey, and Dean Wareham) – 3:26 (vocals by Wareham)
"Missionary Death Song" (Buck, Martin, McCaughey) – 2:51 (vocals by McCaughey)
"A Spark in the Wind" (Buck, Mark Eitzel, Martin, and McCaughey) – 2:56 (vocals by Eitzel)
"Madrigal" (Buck, Louris, Martin, and McCaughey) – 4:14 (vocals by Louris)
"All the Colors in the World" (Buck, Martin, McCaughey, Mark Olson) – 4:40 (vocals by Olson and Victoria Williams)
"Orpheus Must Die" (Buck, John Wesley Harding, Martin, and McCaughey) – 3:20 (vocals by Harding and Gina Sala)
"Your Ghost Town" (Buck, Martin, McCaughey, and Wareham) – 1:12 (vocals by Wareham)
"Thank You Jesus" (Barks, Buck, Martin, and McCaughey) – 1:26 (vocals by Barks)
"Rainbow Drops" (Buck, Martin, McCaughey, and Victoria Williams) – 2:50 (vocals by Williams)
"Love Is" (Buck, Louris, Martin, and McCaughey) – 4:50 (vocals by Louris)
"Oxman Spoonmaker" (Barks, Buck, Martin, and McCaughey) – 3:47 (vocals by Barks)

Tuatara members
Peter Buck – acoustic and electric guitars, banjo, dulcimer
Dave Carter – trumpet
Jessy Greene – violin, cello
Kevin Hudson – electric and upright bass
Barrett Martin – drums, vibraphone, piano, organ, Arabic drums, percussion, backing vocals
Scott McCaughey – acoustic and electric guitars, piano, organ, harmonica, backing vocals
Elizabeth Pupo-Walker – percussion

2007 albums
Tuatara (band) albums